The attack on Orahovac was a 3-day long clash Between 17 and 20 July 1998 and was fought between the forces of the Kosovo Liberation Army (KLA) and the FR Yugoslavia. The KLA surrounded Serb villages intending to assert authority for the Kosovo Albanian provisional government through taking over a town and creating a corridor between KLA hotbed in Drenica and the Albanian border region. 8 KLA fighters and two Yugoslav police officers were killed, as well as five Serb civilians during the attack, while 85 Serb civilians were abducted by the KLA, forty of whom are presumed to have been murdered.

Events

Between 17 and 20 July 1998 there was an armed conflict in Orahovac in western Kosovo between the Kosovo Liberation Army (KLA) and the Yugoslav police and army. This was KLA's first attack on a city. Up until then the KLA had fought only in villages where it enjoyed strong support of locals. It came after the KLA's transformation from a terrorist group to a guerrilla force leading an uprising against Serbian rule in the west and northwest of Kosovo in spring 1998. In late June, after setting up roadblocks around urban centres, the KLA controlled over 50% of Kosovo territory. The Yugoslav authorities concentrated on guarding the cities and towns and their communication links instead of attempting to counter the spreading of KLA. In order to assert authority for the Kosovo Albanian provisional government, the KLA needed to capture a town, and accordingly attacked Orahovac. It was very thoroughly prepared. There were no Yugoslav troops in Orahovac, while the population was 80% Albanian. The KLA had in the preceding days deployed troops in nearby villages from their base at Mališevo. Some took the situation seriously, the mayor having spoke to daily Politika Ekspres about expecting a "major terrorist attack". Many locals had their women and children evacuated before the attack. The takeover would give the KLA major strategic advantage as it would form a corridor between Drenica (the KLA hotbed) and the Yugoslav–Albanian border region in the southwest.

The attack began on Friday, 17 July, with simultaneous attacks on the town's strategic objects (police headquarters, post office, hospital and hotel). The fighting was most intense on 18 July. The KLA abducted 85 ethnic Serbs during the offensive. 8 KLA fighters and two police officers were killed. Five Serb civilians were killed in Orahovac during the attack, while another forty of the abducted are presumed to have been murdered.

Simultaneously with the attack, the KLA attacked neighbouring Serb villages. Serb civilians were expelled from villages Opteruša and Retimlje. With light artillery and machine guns, the KLA attacked for 45 minutes the Zočište Monastery where thirty elderly Serbs had taken shelter, together with seven monks and a nun, and damaged the communal house with two grenades. Local Serbs told HRW that the monks resisted with four rifles for two hours before giving up. The KLA took everyone in the monastery to a school in nearby Semetište. Of the abducted Serbs, 35 were subsequently released on 22 July, and another ten on the night of 29–30 July. The fate of the other estimated forty abductees was unknown as of 2001. In 2005 remains of 47 victims were excavated in two mass graves in Klina and Mališevo.

The KLA had been decisively defeated, with considerable losses. They were later pushed out across Mališevo.

Journalists were allowed into the town on 22 July, reporting that 15 buildings had been destroyed, most of the population had left and homes and shops had been looted.

Aftermath and legacy
In response of the KLA offensive on Orahovac, a major offensive with armour and air support forced the KLA into the hills and abandon their territory. Tens of thousands of Albanians, together with KLA fighters, fled the military onslaught which devastated their villages.

Of Orahovac's pre-war 5,200 Serb inhabitants, as of 2012 only 500 remain. In late 1998, Albanian extremists killed over 60 Serbs from the Serb villages in the area. The Zočište Monastery was destroyed on 13–14 September 1999. All of Zočište's 300 Serbs that lived there in June 1999 have left the village and their property seized by Albanians. Today, only three Serbian Orthodox monks remain, at the monastery. The return of 200 Serbs to 44 renovated houses in Zočište was stopped by the local Albanians some years ago. In Retimlje, Serbs' houses and lands are illegally used by Albanians, if not destroyed and abandoned, while the Orthodox church and graveyard are destroyed, a parking lot built at the place of the church. When a local Serb asked international organizations and the Office for Kosovo and Metohija if there were plans on renovating houses in Retimlje and Opteruša in order for Serbs to return, it was said that there were no plans and that it was very risky. As of 2017, there is no Serb community in Zočište, Opteruša, Retimlje, Smać, Zojić, Mala Kruša, Donja Srbica and Gornja Srbica. A Serb enclave exists in Velika Hoča.

A religious memorial service for the victims was held at the St. Prokopije Church in Belgrade in 2012. The Orahovac case was investigated by the ICTY but no charges were filed. It was then handed over to the UNMIK, and then EULEX, after which an investigation was launched in September 2010 that led to the arrest of two Kosovo Albanians in April 2011. The arrested however stand on trial for expelling non-Albanian civilians from Orahovac, and not killing civilians. A statue was built honoring Xhelal Hajda Toni and Selajdin Mullabazi Mici.

Annotations

References

Sources

External links
News articles

Videos

Military operations of the Kosovo War
Conflicts in 1998
1998 in Kosovo
July 1998 events in Europe
Orahovac
Kidnapped Serbian people
Albanian war crimes in the Kosovo War
Attacks on office buildings
Attacks on churches in Europe
Attacks on police stations in the 1990s
Attacks on hospitals
Attacks on hotels in Europe
Battles involving FR Yugoslavia